Nebria sitiens is a species of ground beetle in the Nebriinae subfamily that is endemic to Morocco.

References

sitiens
Beetles described in 1937
Beetles of North Africa
Endemic fauna of Morocco